The Mountain is the ninth studio album by American country music singer Dierks Bentley. It was released on June 8, 2018 via Capitol Records Nashville. It features the singles "Woman, Amen", "Burning Man" (a duet with Brothers Osborne) and "Living". The album was co-produced by Jon Randall and Ross Copperman.

Content
Bentley wrote 10 of the 13 songs on the album. Most of it was written after he performed at the Telluride Bluegrass Festival in Telluride, Colorado. He recorded it at the Studio in the Clouds in that town in November 2017. According to Bentley, the album mixes the  bluegrass influence of his 2010 album Up on the Ridge with the rock music influence of his previous disc, 2016's Black. Serving as record producers are those two albums' respective producers, Jon Randall and Ross Copperman.

The album includes two vocal collaborations: "Burning Man" featuring Brothers Osborne and "Travelin' Light" featuring Brandi Carlile. Bluegrass musicians Jerry Douglas, Sam Bush, and Tim O'Brien are also featured.

Commercial performance
The Mountain debuted at No. 1 on Billboards Top Country Albums and No. 3 on the US Billboard 200, with 102,000 album-equivalent units, 94,000 of which are traditional album sales. The album is Dierks Bentley's ninth top 10 and the best debut sales week of his career. It sold another 13,400 copies (18,200 units) in the second week. It has sold 193,400 copies in the United States as of September 2019.

Critical reception 
Rolling Stone praised the album, particularly the track "You Can't Bring Me Down," with writer Luke Levenson commenting, "Dierks Bentley is continuing his celebration of resilience and strength with "You Can't Bring Me Down," which, following previous releases "Woman, Amen," "The Mountain," and "Living," returns the production level to its basics."

Track listing

Personnel
Adapted from The Mountain liner notes.

Musicians
 Dierks Bentley – lead vocals (all tracks), background vocals (1–4, 7, 8)
 Alan Bradbury – background vocals (1, 2)
 Sam Bush – mandolin (5, 7, 12)
 Brandi Carlile – duet vocals (12)
 Matt Chamberlain – drums (all tracks), percussion (1, 2, 5, 9–11), programming (8)
 Ross Copperman – acoustic guitar (3, 6, 7, 10, 11), electric guitar (3, 6, 7), background vocals (3–7, 9), keyboards (3, 4, 6, 7, 10, 11), programming (3, 4, 6, 7, 11), percussion (6, 7, 11)
 Luke Dick – acoustic guitar (1), electric guitar (1, 2), background vocals (1, 2), percussion (1), programming (1)
 Jerry Douglas – Dobro (8, 12)
 Dan Dugmore – electric guitar (3, 10), pedal steel guitar (9, 11, 13)
 Ian Fitchuk – bass guitar (all tracks), keyboards (1, 2, 4, 5, 10, 13), bass synthesizer (6)
 Ben Helson – banjo (2, 5, 12), acoustic guitar (3, 4, 7–11), mandolin (4)
 Dan Hochhalter – fiddle (2, 5, 9)
 Jedd Hughes – electric guitar (all tracks), acoustic guitar (1, 4, 5)
 Josh Kear – background vocals (4)
 Jamie Kenney – keyboards (8)
 Hillary Lindsey – background vocals (5)
 Rob McNelley – electric guitar (1, 5–7, 10, 11)
 Heather Morgan – background vocals (11)
 Jon Nite – background vocals (3, 6)
 Tim O'Brien – background vocals (1), fiddle (1), bouzouki (8)
 John Osborne – electric guitar (1)
 T.J. Osborne – lead vocals (1)
 Danny Rader – acoustic guitar (6, 7), electric guitar (6, 7), keyboards (6, 7), banjo (7), bouzouki (7), programming (7)
 Jon Randall – acoustic guitar (2–6, 9–13), mandolin (4, 5), background vocals (5, 7, 9, 10, 13)
 F. Reid Shippen – bass synthesizer (1), programming (3, 4)

Technical
 Arturo Buenahora Jr. – executive production
 Ross Copperman – production
 Pete Lyman – mastering
 Jon Randall – production
 F. Reid Shippen – recording, mixing

Charts

Weekly charts

Year-end charts

Certifications

References

2018 albums 
Albums produced by Ross Copperman
Albums produced by Jon Randall
Dierks Bentley albums
Capitol Records Nashville albums